Saeed Naqvi is senior Indian journalist, television commentator, interviewer. He has interviewed world leaders and personalities in India and abroad, which appear in newspapers, magazines and on national television, remained editor of the World Report, a syndication service on foreign affairs, and has written for several publication, both global and Indian, including the BBC News, The Sunday Observer, The Sunday Times, The Guardian, Washington Post, The Indian Express, The Citizen and Outlook magazine. At the Indian Express, he started in 1977 as a Special Correspondent and eventually becoming, editor, Indian Express, Madras, (1979–1984), and Foreign Editor, The Indian Express, Delhi in 1984, and continues to writes columns and features for the paper.

Career

Saeed Naqvi started his journalist career as Staff Reporter with The Statesman, Delhi in 1964, later he became editor of the Sunday Magazine. During this period, in spring of '68, when The Beatles visited India, he along with fellow photographer, Raghu Rai filed new reports and photographs for newspapers.

As editor and producer, of WORLD REPORT, a weekly foreign affairs show on Doordarshan (the national network) called Worldview India, apart from a prime time international news and features series entitled It's A Small World (1997–1999) for Star TV. From 1986–1997 WORLD REPORT produced an international affairs series entitled World Report for Doordarshan, featuring interviews with major world leaders.

Thereafter it produced a series of programmes entitled Hamara Bharat (Our India) on India's syncretic culture. Saeed has been Editor, Foreign Editor, Foreign Correspondent for major Indian dailies – The Indian Express, The Statesman and written for a range of publications like New York Times, The Sunday Times, The Guardian, Washington Post, Boston Globe and others. 

During his long career, Saeed Naqvi has interviewed world famous leaders and politicians including Nelson Mandela, Fidel Castro, Muammar Gaddafi, Henry Kissinger, Benazir Bhutto, Hamid Karzai, Shimon Peres and more.

Personal life
Saeed Naqvi is born and brought up in Mustafabad, Lucknow. He studied at La Martinière College, Lucknow.

Naqvi married to Aruna Naqvi and has three daughters, journalist Saba Naqvi and writer Farah Naqvi and Zeba Akhtar. His mother is Atia Naqvi while his brother is Shanney Naqvi.

Books 

 Reflections of an Indian Muslim (1993)
 The Last Brahmin Prime Minister (1996)
 Being the Other: The Muslim in India (2016)
 Watan mein ghair وطن میں غیر : Hindustani Musalmaan (2018) – Urdu translation of Strangers in their own country: The Muslims in India 
 The Muslim Vanishes (2022)

Awards
 National Integration Award 2003, awarded by the National Commission for Minorities in New Delhi on 18 December. The award was conferred "for his outstanding contribution towards promoting communal harmony and national integrity".

References

External links
 Personal website
 Saeed Naqvi, columns at The Indian Express
 Saeed Naqvi, columns at Outlook
 Saeed Naqvi at NewsX

La Martinière College, Lucknow alumni
Indian male television journalists
Indian Shia Muslims
Kirori Mal College alumni
Indian columnists
Writers from Lucknow
Indian television talk show hosts
Indian newspaper editors
Living people
20th-century Indian journalists
Journalists from Uttar Pradesh
1940 births